Goniaeola foveolata is a species of picture-winged fly in the family Ulidiidae.

References

Ulidiidae
Taxa named by Friedrich Georg Hendel
Insects described in 1909